The Bank Notes Tax Act 1910 (Cth) was an Act of the Parliament of Australia which imposed a prohibitive tax on banknotes issued by banks in Australia. The Act was enacted in October 1910 by the Fisher Labour Government under Section 51 (xii) of the Constitution of Australia that gives the Commonwealth Parliament the power to legislate with respect to “currency, coinage, and legal tender” and the taxing power.

The Act 

The Act imposed an annual tax of 10% on "all bank notes issued or re-issued by any bank in the Commonwealth after the commencement of this Act and not redeemed." The tax commenced in March 1911.

In September 1910, the federal government had passed the Australian Notes Act 1910 which introduced an Australian national currency, the Australian pound, and, as part of the scheme, the objective of the Act was to end the use of private currency in Australia, which it had achieved.

Legacy

The Act was repealed by the Commonwealth Bank Act 1945, enacted by the Chifley Labor Government, which instead imposed a fine for issuing a private currency. S.44(1) of the Reserve Bank Act 1959 now prohibits private and state currencies.

See also

 Section 51(xii) of the Australian Constitution
 Private currency
 Taxation in Australia
 Australian dollar
 Australian Notes Act 1910

References

Currencies of Australia
Repealed Acts of the Parliament of Australia
1910 in Australian law
History of taxation in Australia